Eupithecia larentimima is a moth in the family Geometridae. It is found in Zhejiang Province, China.

References

Moths described in 1974
larentimima
Moths of Asia